Chad Mullane (born November 28, 1979) is an Australian comedian, actor, writer, director, translator, academic and producer based in Japan.

Career 

Chad became the first non-Japanese comedian to enter Japan's highest-profile comedy college Yoshimoto New Star Creation (NSC) and join Yoshimoto Kogyo in 1998. As an award-winning manzai artist he has since hosted, co-hosted and made guest appearances on thousands of comedy and variety television shows. Having ranked among the top 50 comedians in Japan by reaching the semi-finals of the prestigious M-1 Grand Prix for a record eight-years consecutively, he still performs live at theaters across Japan as one part of his comedy duo (which is also called "Chad Mullane.")

As an actor Chad has performed in many award-winning films, drama series and he has also been featured in several advertising campaigns. As a writer he has frequently contributed to publications at NHK Publications and The Japan Times, and he has also authored the book The Peculiar Case of Japanese Comedy.  As an academic he teaches comedy at NSC, guest lectures at universities throughout Japan and will be one of the founding lecturers at Tokyo's 'i University' opening in 2020. Chad has been an advisor to the Japanese government and its promotion of Japanese culture through the  Cool Japan initiative since March 2019.

Influences 

Growing up in Australia, Chad was exposed to American, British and Australian humor, but developed an interest in owarai (Japanese comedy) after a student exchange program took him by chance to Osaka (a.k.a. "The City of Comedy.") Having been exposed to the rich culture of uniquely Japanese comedy (including manzai, conte, shinkigeki, oogiri and batsu game,) and being particularly fascinated by the talent of comedy duo Downtown's Hitoshi Matsumoto, Chad joined NSC, after which he spent two years as an apprentice to The Bonchi's Osamu (the first manzai artist to sell out the 14,000 capacity Nippon Budokan.) By taking Osamu as his mentor, Chad became one of only three "brothers" to cult comedian Jimmy Onishi (of Downtown no Gaki no Tsukai ya Arahende!!-fame) and shinkigeki leader Hiro Yoshida. Chad was recognized by Hitoshi Matsumoto in 2006, and after being nicknamed "The Osaka-ralian," was invited to appear on the bi-annual TV show all comedians aspire to be on: Hitoshi Matsumoto no suberanai hanashi. Chad has since collaborated with Matsumoto on several TV shows and films.

Awards and nominations

Filmography

Film
{| class = "wikitable sortable"
|-
! Year
! Title
! Role
! class = "unsortable" | Notes
|-
| 2004
| Moon & Cherry
| Paul
|-
| 2007
| Ten Nights of Dreams
| Yassan
|-
| 2007
| Honeystar
| Groom
| Written & directed by
|-
| 2008
| Lala Pipo
| Mr. Lala Pipo
|-
| 2009
| Elite Yankee Saburo
| First Guy to Die
|-
| 2009
| Nodame Cantabile: The Movie
| Paul Dubois, Jane Dubois, Jean Dubois, Claude Dubois
|-
| 2010
| Nemuriba
| Chad
|-
| 2010
|Not Enough Hands
| Chicken Ball Boy
| Written & directed by
|-
| 2012
| Grafreeter Toki
| Jack Hanma
|-
| 2012
| [[Space Brothers (manga)#Films|Space Brothers]]| Raleigh Cuomo
|-
| 2012
| Paper Rabbit Rope| Jose the Alpaca (voice)
|-
| 2014
| Judge!| Alex Moylan
|-
| 2014
| Dogeza Japan| Mr. Mediocre
| Written & directed by
|-
| 2015
| Samurai of the Dead| Zombie George
|-
| 2015
| Sideline| Nabihiko Tsuji
|-
| 2016
| Kamen Rider Ghost: The 100 Eyecons and Ghost's Fated Moment| Thomas Edison
|-
| 2017
| Zen and Bones: Henry Mittwer| John Mittwer
|-
| 2017
| The Stand-In Thief| Dave Ross
|-
| 2018
| Movies: Mr. Fukyô vs eiga-tachi| Mr. NEET
|-
| 2018
| Jesus| Jesus
| Won New Director's Award at 2018 San Sebastián International Film Festival
|-
| 2019
| Roots| Tommy
| Short film
|}

 Television 

 Drama Series 

 Daily Shows 

 Weekly Shows 

 Music videos 

 Advertising Campaigns 

 Publications 

 Books 

 Regular Contributions 

 Translation Works 

 Feature films 

 Web series 

 Illustrated Books 

 Impressions 
Haley Joel Osment
Sylvester Stallone
Michael Schumacher
Setsuko from Grave of the Fireflies''
Celine Dion
Paris Hilton
Disney Witches
Zlatan Ibrahimović
Diego Forlán
Carles Puyol

References

External links 
 

1979 births
Living people
Australian comedians
Australian expatriate actors
Australian expatriates in Japan
21st-century Australian male actors
Australian male television actors
Australian male film actors
Male actors from Perth, Western Australia
21st-century Australian male writers
Writers from Perth, Western Australia
Australian television presenters
Japanese television personalities